This is a list of famous roads, streets and avenues in and around Kolkata (former Calcutta).

 Jessore Road
 Kalyani Expressway
 Belghoria Expressway
 Barrackpore Trunk Road
 VIP Road
 Aurobindo Sarani
 Raja Nabakrishna Street
 Vivekananda Road
 Bidhan Sarani
 AJC Bose Road & APC Road
 Chittaranjan Avenue
 Strand Road
 MG Road
 Amherst Street
 College Street
 Bepin Behari Ganguly Street
 Netaji Subhash Road
 Hare Street
 Chowringhee Road
 Park Street
 Sudder Street
 Camac Street
 Mirza Ghalib Street
 Shakespeare Sarani
 Red Road
 Gobinda Chandra Khatik Road
 Pulin Khatik Road
 Eastern Metropolitan Bypass
 Ballygunge Circular Road
 Gurusaday Dutta Road
 Gariahat Road
 Sarat Bose Road
 Rashbehari Avenue
 Southern Avenue
 Prince Anwar Shah Road
 Raja SC Mullick Road
 Netaji Subhash Chandra Bose Road
 Zakaria Street

References

 
Kolkata-related lists
Shopping districts and streets in India
Kolkata